The following is a timeline of the history of the city of Nashville, Tennessee, United States.

Prior to 19th century

 1780
 Fort Nashborough established.
 Cumberland Compact signed; Cumberland Association formed.
 1784 – Nashville established.
 1785 – Davidson Academy incorporated.
 1789 – Methodist church built.
 1796 – Settlement becomes part of the state of Tennessee.
 1797 – Tennessee Gazette and Mero District Advertiser newspaper begins publication.

19th century
 1806
 Town incorporated.
 Joseph Coleman becomes mayor.
 1812 – Tennessee General Assembly relocates to Nashville from Knoxville.
 1813 – Nashville Library Co., Inc. established.
 1817 – Tennessee General Assembly relocates from Nashville to Knoxville.
 1818
 Earl's Nashville Museum opens.
 Population: 3,000 (approximate).
 1820 – Christian Church built.
 1822 – Nashville City Cemetery established.
 1823 – Presbyterian church built.
 1825 – Decker & Dyer Reading Room established.
 1826
 Tennessee General Assembly relocates to Nashville from Murfreesboro.
 Cumberland College opened.
 1829 – Christ Church built.
 1830 – Population: 5,566.
 1831 – Tennessee State Penitentiary built.
 1833 – Water-works established.
 1835 – Tennessee Society for the Diffusion of Knowledge organized.
 1837 – House of Industry for Females established.
 1838 – First Baptist Church built.
 1840 – Population: 6,929.
 1841 – Mechanics' Library Association formed.
 1842 – Burns & Co. in business.
 1843 – Nashville becomes capital of Tennessee.
 1844 – Tennessee School for the Blind and Mechanics Institute and Library Association established.
 1845 – Protestant Orphan Asylum established.
 1847 – St. Mary's Cathedral built.
 1849 – Merchants' Library and Reading Room and Tennessee Historical Society founded.
 1850
 June: Nashville Convention held.
 Suspension bridge built over the Cumberland River.
 Population: 10,165.
 1851
 Nashville Gas Light Company in operation.
 Nashville, Chattanooga and St. Louis Railway starts operating.
 1852
 Public school system inaugurated.
 Davidson County Jail built.
 1854
 Southern Methodist Publishing House headquartered in Nashville.
 Tennessee State Library established.
 1855 – Giers photo studio in business.
 1856 – Church of the Assumption built.
 1857 – Davidson County Court House rebuilt.
 1858 – City Workhouse and Church of St. Ann's built.
 1859
 Tennessee State Capitol, draw-bridge, and Central Baptist Church built.
 Louisville and Nashville Railroad begins operating.
 1860 - Population: 16,988.
 1862
 City under Union control.
 Fort Negley built.
 1863 – St. Mary's Catholic Orphan Asylum founded.
 1864 – December 15–16: Battle of Nashville.
 1865 – Fisk Free Colored School, Ward Seminary for Young Ladies, and Earhart's Bryant & Stratton's Commercial College established.
 1866 – Central Tennessee College founded.
 1867
 Montgomery Bell Academy opens.
 Nashville Lyceum Association incorporated.
 1869 – Howard Chapel built.
 1870
 Sulphur Dell ballpark opens.
 Population: 25,865.
 1871
 Tennessee and Pacific Railroad (Lebanon-Nashville) begins operating.
 Fisk University Jubilee Singers, Library Association, and Nashville Saddlery Company established.
 1873 – Vanderbilt University established.
 1874 – Hebrew temple and First Cumberland Presbyterian Church built.
 1876 – Nashville Banner newspaper begins publication.
 1880 – Population: 43,350.
 1884 – Nashville Athletic Club formed.
 1885 – Industrial School and Query Club (women's group) established.
 1889
 The Hermitage museum opens.
 Boscobel College for Young Ladies established.
 Peabody Normal College active.
 1890 – Population: 76,168.
 1891
 Nashville Bible School founded.
 Cumberland Park opened as a horse racing track.
 1892
 March 17: St. Patrick's Day Snowstorm dumps 17 inches of snow on the city.
 Union Gospel Tabernacle built.
 Maxwell House coffee introduced.
 1893 - Tennessee Central Railway starts operating.
 1894 - United Daughters of the Confederacy headquartered in Nashville.
 1897
 Tennessee Centennial and International Exposition held.
 Parthenon opened, a replica of the original, functions as an art museum.
 1898
 Howard Library established.
 Tennessee State Penitentiary rebuilt.
 1900
 Meharry Medical College active.
 Population: 80,865.
 Polk Place demolished.

20th century

1900s-1940s
 1904 – Carnegie Library opens.
 1905 – Centennial Club (women's group) active.
 1906
 Tennessee State Fair begins.
 Nashville Globe newspaper begins publication.
 1907 – Nashville Tennessean newspaper in publication.
 1909 
 Sparkman Street Bridge opens.
 Cumberland College closes.
 1910
 Nashville Art Association chartered
 Hermitage Hotel in business
 Advance Publishing Company incorporated
 Population: 110,364
 1912 - Urban League branch established.
 1916 – Nashville Housewives League organized.
 1918
 July 9: Great Train Wreck of 1918.
 1918 influenza epidemic.
 1920 – Population: 118,342.
 1922 - Nashville's first radio station, WDAA, signs on
 1925
 War Memorial Auditorium dedicated.
 WSM radio and its Grand Ole Opry begin broadcasting.
 Belcourt Theatre built.
 1926 - WLAC radio begins broadcasting.
 1927
 Warner Parks open.
 WSIX radio begins broadcasting.
 1930
 First American National Bank formed.
 Population: 153,866.
 1931
 Nashville Children's Theatre established.
 Parthenon rebuilt.
 1936 – Berry Field (airport) dedicated.
 1937 – Tennessee State Museum established.
 1940 - Population: 167,402.
 1941
 W47NV radio licensed.
 Iroquois Steeplechase begins.
 1942 – Acuff-Rose Music and Harveys (department store) in business.
 1946 – Nashville Symphony founded.

1950s-1990s
 1950
 WSM-TV begins broadcasting.
 Population: 174,307.
 1951
 Ben West becomes mayor.
 The Harpeth Hall School opens.
 1952 - Tennessee Theatre opens.
 1953 – WSIX-TV begins broadcasting.
 1954 – WLAC-TV begins broadcasting.
 1955 - Brothers Owen and Harold Bradley establish Bradley's Film & Recording Studio, the first studio in what will become Nashville's Music Row neighborhood.
 1957
 Nashville, Chattanooga and St. Louis Railway stops operating.
 Life & Casualty Tower built.
 RCA Studios begins operation at the corner of 17th Ave. S. and Hawkins St. It will become known as RCA Studio B.
 1960
 Nashville sit-ins for civil rights occur.
 Cheekwood Museum opens.
 Population: 170,874.
 1961 – Country Music Hall of Fame and Museum established.
 1962
 WDCN-TV begins broadcasting.
 Nashville Municipal Auditorium opens.
 1963
 City consolidates its government with Davidson County.
 Metropolitan Council (Nashville) established.
 Beverly Briley becomes mayor.
 1964 - American Association for State and Local History headquartered in Nashville. 
 1967 – 100 Oaks Mall in business near city.
 1968 – Third National Bank Building constructed.
 1970 - Population: 448,003.
 1972
 Fan Fair music festival begins.
 Opryland USA opens.
 1974
 Regions Center (Nashville) built.
 Grand Ole Opry House opens.
 1975 – Richard Fulton becomes mayor.
 1978 - The Nashville Sounds minor-league baseball team plays its inaugural season.
 1980
 Tennessee Performing Arts Center opens.
 Sri Ganesha Temple established.
 Population: 455,651.
 1981 – Nashville Opera Guild chartered.
 1982 - Foreign trade zone established.
 Bluebird Cafe opens 
 1983 - Nissan car manufactory begins operating in nearby Smyrna.
 1985 – Starwood Amphitheatre opens.
 1986 – Tennessee Players founded.
 1987
 Nashville Airport terminal built.
 Bill Boner becomes mayor.
 1988 – Nashville Shakespeare Festival and Nashville Pride begin.
 1989
 Nashville Scene begins publication.
 Prince's Hot Chicken Shack in business (approximate date).
 1990
 Grassmere Wildlife Park established.
 Population: 488,374.
 1991 – Phil Bredesen becomes mayor.
 1994
 City website online.
 South Central Bell Building constructed.
 American Airlines begins nonstop service between London and Nashville. 
 1996
 Bicentennial Mall State Park opens.
 Magdalene program for women, and Nashville Zoo at Grassmere established.
 Nashville Arena built.
 1998
 April 15–16: Tornado.
 After playing in Memphis for one season, the Tennessee OIlers football team plays its first Nashville games at Vanderbilt Stadium.
 Nashville Predators ice hockey team formed.
 1999
 Adelphia Coliseum opens.
 Bill Purcell becomes mayor.
 Al Gore presidential campaign, 2000 headquartered in city.
 2000 – The City Paper begins publication.

21st century

 2001
 Tennessee Immigrant Rights Coalition headquartered in city.
 Frist Center for the Visual Arts established.
 2002 Nashville Public Education Foundation established by Nelson C. Andrews and Thomas J. Sherrard
 2003 – Shelby Street pedestrian bridge opens.
 2006
 Schermerhorn Symphony Center opens.
 Viridian Tower built.
 Car manufacturer Nissan's North American headquarters in business in nearby Franklin.
 2007 – Karl Dean becomes mayor.
 2008 – Nashville for All of Us (group) organized.
 2009
 Third Man Records in business.
 The Pinnacle at Symphony Place built.
 Live on the Green begins.
 Voters reject Nashville English Only Amendment.
 2010
 April–May: Flood.
 Population: 601,222.
 2011
 October: Occupy Nashville begins.
 Parnassus Books in business.
 2012
 March: Occupy Vanderbilt begins.
 MyCity Academy (government program) established.
 Fictional Nashville TV series makes national premiere on ABC, transfers to CMT in 2016 after being cancelled by the former and due to fan efforts
 2013 – Music City Center opens.
 2015
 Construction begins on 505 skyscraper.
 Megan Barry becomes mayor.
 2020
 Tornado outbreak of March 2-3, 2020: 22 people killed in tornadoes in Tennessee and Kentucky; the Nashville EF-3 tornado, which kills 4, north of downtown, somewhat mirrors the 1998 tornado's path
 The Nashville bombing occurs, injuring three people and causing major damage

See also
 History of Nashville, Tennessee
 National Register of Historic Places listings in Davidson County, Tennessee
 List of mayors of Nashville, Tennessee
 List of companies based in Nashville
 Nashville sister city timelines: Caen, Magdeburg
 Timelines of other cities in Tennessee: Chattanooga, Clarksville, Knoxville, Memphis, Murfreesboro

References

Bibliography

Published in 19th century

Published in 20th century

1900s-1940s
 
 
 
 
 
 
  Map

1950s-1990s
 
 

 Doyle, Don H. (1985). Nashville Since the 1920s
   (Includes information about Nashville)

Published in 21st century

External links

 
 
 
 Library of Congress, Prints & Photos Division. Materials related to Nashville, Tennessee, various dates
 Tennessee State Library and Archives. Nashville City Directories, various dates (digitized)
 Digital Public Library of America. Items related to Nashville, various dates.
 

 
Nashville
Nashville, Tennessee-related lists